Thallophaga nigroseriata is a species of geometrid moth in the family Geometridae. It is found in North America.

The MONA or Hodges number for Thallophaga nigroseriata is 6810.

References

Further reading

 

Lithinini
Articles created by Qbugbot
Moths described in 1873